The masked triggerfish (Sufflamen fraenatum) is a species of triggerfish usually found living in coastal reefs or in lagoons. The range of depths where these triggerfish can live varies from 8 to 186 m.

They are found along the Indian Ocean coast of Africa and throughout much of the Indo-Pacific region from Indonesia to the Hawaiian Islands.

References

External links 
 Fishes of Australia : Bridled Triggerfish, Sufflamen fraenatum (Latreille 1804)

masked triggerfish
Fish of India
Fish of Sri Lanka
Marine fauna of East Africa
Fish of Indonesia
Fish of Hawaii
Marine fish of Northern Australia
Taxa named by Charles Henry Gilbert
Taxa named by Edwin Chapin Starks
masked triggerfish